Richard John Robinson (5 May 1950 – 20 March 2002) was an English cricketer.  Robinson was a hard hitting right-handed batsman who bowled right-arm medium-fast.  He was born in Ipswich, Suffolk.

Robinson made his debut for Suffolk in the 1968 Minor Counties Championship against Norfolk.  Robinson played Minor counties cricket for Suffolk from 1968 to 1989, which included 95 Minor Counties Championship appearances and 2 MCCA Knockout Trophy appearances.  He made his List A debut against Sussex in the 1978 Gillette Cup.  He made 7 further List A appearances, the last of which came against Northamptonshire in the 1989 NatWest Trophy.  In his 8 List A matches, he scored 95 runs at an average of 15.83, with a high score of 40 not out.  With the ball, he took 8 wickets at a bowling average of 35.75, with best figures of 3/59.

He died in the town of his birth on 20 March 2002.

References

External links
Richard Robinson at ESPNcricinfo
Richard Robinson at CricketArchive

1950 births
2002 deaths
Cricketers from Ipswich
English cricketers
Suffolk cricketers